Wayne Pocket Rocket McCullough (born Wayne William McCullough; 7 July 1970) is a former professional boxer from Northern Ireland who competed from 1993 to 2008. He held the WBC bantamweight title from 1995 to 1997, becoming the first boxer from Northern Ireland to win a WBC championship.

He challenged six times for world titles at super-bantamweight and featherweight. As an amateur, McCullough represented Ireland at the 1992 Summer Olympics, winning a bantamweight silver medal. He also won flyweight gold at the 1990 Commonwealth Games, representing Northern Ireland.

In addition to McCullough's dogged, relentless attacking style, he was renowned for his durable chin, having fought two of boxing's biggest punchers in Naseem Hamed and Érik Morales, and gone the full distance with both of them. During his bout with Morales in 1999, HBO commentator Larry Merchant joked, "If you look in the dictionary, under 'Tough Irishman', you'll find a picture of Wayne McCullough". McCullough was never once knocked down in his professional career. He also stopped the late Arturo Gatti as an amateur.

Amateur career
McCullough had a very successful amateur career, amassing a record of 319 wins and 11 defeats, with over 100 wins coming by way of knockout. As an amateur living in the staunchly loyalist Shankill Road area of Belfast, he was selected by the island-wide Irish Amateur Boxing Association to participate in the 1988 Summer Olympics in Seoul, Korea, and asked to carry the Irish flag as the youngest member of the team (aged 18). He went on to win a silver medal for Ireland at the 1992 Summer Olympics in Barcelona.

Representing Northern Ireland at the 1990 Commonwealth Games, Auckland, he won a gold medal and carried the Northern Ireland flag in the closing ceremony. The medal ceremony for his Commonwealth title was marked by an unusual incident. A technical problem with the public address system made it impossible to play the recording of the song "Danny Boy", used instead of an anthem for medalists from Northern Ireland. The New Zealand official in charge of the sound, Bob Gibson, promptly took the microphone and sang the song unaccompanied. In 1990, McCullough also won Bronze for Ireland at the Boxing World Cup in Mumbai, India.

1988 Olympic Games
Representing Ireland at Light Flyweight, in the Seoul Olympic Games. Results were:
First Round bye
Defeated Fred Mutuweta  – Points
Lost to Scotty Olson  – Points

1990 Commonwealth Games
Representing Northern Ireland at Flyweight and winning Gold, in the Auckland Commonwealth Games. Results were:
Defeated Benjamin Mwangata  – Points
Defeated Maurice Maina  – Points
Defeated Nokuthula Tshabangu  – Points

1990 World Cup
Representing Ireland at Flyweight and winning Bronze, in the Mumbai World Cup. Results were:
Defeated Manoj Pingle  – Points
Defeated D.K. Park  – Points
Lost to Serafim Todorov  – Points
Defeated Fred Mutuweta  – Points

1991 World Championships
Representing Ireland at Bantamweight, in the Sydney World Championships. Results were:
Defeated Felipe Costa  – TKO (Round 2)
Defeated Joseph Zabakly  – Points
Lost to Enrique Carrion  – Points

1992 Olympic Games
Representing Ireland at Bantamweight and winning Silver, in the Barcelona Olympic Games. Results were:
Defeated Fred Mutuweta  – Points
Defeated Ahmed Abbood  – Points
Defeated Mohammed Sabo  – Points
Defeated Gwang-Sik Li  – Points
Lost to Joel Casamayor  – Points

Professional career

In 1993 McCullough moved to Las Vegas to train under Eddie Futch, who agreed to train him after seeing him at the Olympics. McCullough always fought in neutral colours and did not have national anthems played at his fights; his supporters in Northern Ireland include Protestants and Catholics. Within a year of turning pro, he had won the North American Boxing Federation title.

On 30 July 1995, less than 2½ years since his pro debut, he won the WBC championship by beating the champion Yasuei Yakushiji in Nagoya, Japan to become Ireland's first ever WBC world champion. He was the first fighter from Ireland or the UK to travel to Japan and win a belt. He defended his title twice before vacating the belt and moving up in weight to challenge WBC super bantamweight champion Daniel Zaragoza, but lost via a split decision in the WBC "Fight of the Year". After this fight, his wife Cheryl and Stuart Campbell began to manage his career when his original manager, Mat Tinley, became a boxing promoter.

McCullough unsuccessfully challenged champions Naseem Hamed in 1998, and Erik Morales in 1999. In each of those exciting "Fight of the Year" contenders, he broke his opponent's lengthy run of KO wins while taking them the distance. Hamed had knocked out 18 opponents straight before McCullough, and was 30–0 at the time with 28 knockouts to his credit. Morales had knocked out 9 of his previous 9 opponents and was 34–0 at the time, also with 28 knockouts. Morales stated that McCullough gave him one of the top three fights of his career and almost quit on his stool after the 9th round (according to Ring magazine).

In October 2000, McCullough was to return to his native Belfast for a homecoming fight. Two days before the fight was scheduled to take place, he was told that he had a cyst on his brain, he couldn't fight again and that one more blow to the head could kill him. McCullough flew back to Las Vegas and was advised by the Nevada Commission to visit the neurosurgery department at UCLA for a more thorough investigation. Within a few weeks the doctor at UCLA, Neil Martin, called to say he had consulted with some of the top neurosurgeons in the US and they had come to the conclusion that the cyst was not on his brain, but in a space between the brain and the skull – called the arachnoid mater – and that he saw no reason for him to give up his boxing career.

Nevertheless, the British Boxing Board of Control (BBBC) continued to deny him a licence. He was relicensed in Nevada and fought again in January 2002. After a very public battle, the BBBC could no longer deny him a licence and later that same year McCullough stepped back into a British ring under the Frank Warren Promotions banner. Thereafter he had mixed success, winning five fights but losing to Scott Harrison and Mexican world champion Óscar Larios on two occasions. The result of his first fight with Larios is widely disputed.

On 17 August 2005 McCullough was appointed the first WBC World Ambassador for Peace and Goodwill in Sports. In September 2005, McCullough became a United States citizen. In November 2005, McCullough released his autobiography, Pocket Rocket: Don't Quit, in the UK and Ireland. He went on a publicity tour to promote the book, which reached Number 2 on the best sellers list.

In 2007, McCullough joined the Ultimate Fighting Championship organisation as a PR associate, to promote Mixed Martial Arts (MMA). He currently trains fighters both in boxing and MMA and is setting up his own charity – IHOW.

McCullough vs. Martínez
In 2007 McCullough signed to fight Spain's Kiko Martínez who had just defeated Bernard Dunne at the Point Depot, Dublin for the European super bantamweight title. The fight between McCullough and Martínez was due to take place at Belfast's Kings Hall on 1 December 2007.

McCullough had not fought for over two years and the Kings Hall venue was sold out for the fight. However, on the day before the fight there was uproar during the weigh-in and the fight was cancelled by the BBBC amid chaotic scenes.

However, Martínez failed to make the agreed weight and was 1.75 lb over the agreed weight.

Martínez was given a couple of hours to shed the excess weight, but did not return to weigh in again and the scales were closed by a BBBC official. A furious McCullough stated "I couldn't believe it. He comes in over the weight and then after being asked to take it off he just sits there and does nothing. I just can't believe what has happened. I was ready to fight and ready to win and he comes in that much over the weight."

Retirement

On 20 June 2008, McCullough fought Juan Ruiz in the Cayman Islands, his first fight in three years.  He lost in six rounds, retiring on his stool. Despite being ahead on two of three judges' scorecards after six rounds, he told his corner he could not go on due to an injury he had sustained in training. The Belfast boxer took the microphone and revealed this might be his swansong. He said: "I think this could be my last fight and I want to thank you all for coming. I am disappointed with the way things went but I just felt I could not go on."

Personal life
McCullough married Cheryl Rennie, also from Belfast, in the early 1990s.

In May 2004, McCullough changed his name by deed poll.

Professional boxing record

See also
List of Irish sportspeople

References

External links

1970 births
Boxers at the 1988 Summer Olympics
Boxers at the 1990 Commonwealth Games
Boxers at the 1992 Summer Olympics
Male boxers from Northern Ireland
British emigrants to the United States
Commonwealth Games gold medallists for Northern Ireland
Irish male boxers
Irish emigrants to the United States
Living people
Olympic boxers of Ireland
Olympic medalists in boxing
Olympic silver medalists for Ireland
Boxers from Belfast
World bantamweight boxing champions
World Boxing Council champions
American male boxers
Medalists at the 1992 Summer Olympics
Commonwealth Games medallists in boxing
Flyweight boxers
Super-bantamweight boxers
Featherweight boxers
Medallists at the 1990 Commonwealth Games